Originally established as a Maternity Home in 1979, the Aga Khan Hospital for Women, Karimabad is a 41-bed maternity facility offering health care. Located on the premises, the Aga Khan Diagnostic and Day Surgery Centre, Karimabad complements the hospital with diagnostic and surgical services. They are part of the Aga Khan Health Services international referral system with links to the Aga Khan University Hospital, Karachi.

See also
Aga Khan Development Network

References

External links

Hospital buildings completed in 1979
Aga Khan hospitals
Hospitals in Karachi
Hospitals established in 1979
Maternity hospitals
Women in Pakistan